Gordiidae is a family of parasitic horsehair worms belonging to the order Gordioidea.

Description
To date only two genera have been identified in the Gordiidae. These horsehair worms are characterized by a post-cloacal crescent located at the base of the two tail lobes.  The genera are distinguished by the distinctly pointed tips on male Acutogordius tail lobes in comparison with Gordius.  Recorded hosts are usually Polyneopteran insects such as Orthoptera and Mantodea.

Genera

The Global Biodiversity Information Facility lists:
 Acutogordius Heinze, 1952 
 Gordius Linnaeus, 1758

References

External links

Nematomorpha
Parasitic protostomes